Peter Jones Barrett (February 20, 1935 – December 17, 2000) was an American sailor and Olympic champion. He competed at the 1968 Summer Olympics in Mexico City, where he received a gold medal in the star class with the boat North Star, together with Lowell North.

He won the silver medal in the finn class at the 1964 Summer Olympics in Tokyo. He also competed in the Finn event at the 1960 Summer Olympics.

Career 

Barrett competed in three Olympic Games and won two medals. He finished 11th in the Finn at the Naples, Italy Games 1960, won a silver medal in the Finn at the 1964 Tokyo Games, and crewing for Lowell North won the Star class gold medal at the 1968 Games in Acapulco, Mexico. Throughout his competitive career Pete won several championships including the 470 Nationals, Finn North Americans, the C-Scow Blue Chip Regatta, and the A-Scow Inlands. He also crewed aboard the winning boat in the 1971 Chicago-Mackinac Race. In addition, Barrett served as a contributing editor to Yacht Racing/Cruising (now Sailing World), and designed several popular sailboats including the Aquarius 21 and Aquarius 23 built by Coastal Recreation, the RK 21, built by RK Industries, and the Mega 30 built by C&C Yachts.

Barrett was inducted into the National Sailing Hall of Fame in 2012.

Family 

Peter Barrett was the husband of Laurie Barrett (now a retired accountant) and father of three children: Kevin Barrett, Bruce Barrett, and Tara Barrett.

References

External links
 
 

1935 births
2000 deaths
American male sailors (sport)
Sailors at the 1960 Summer Olympics – Finn
Sailors at the 1964 Summer Olympics – Finn
Sailors at the 1968 Summer Olympics – Star
Olympic gold medalists for the United States in sailing
Star class world champions
Medalists at the 1968 Summer Olympics
Medalists at the 1964 Summer Olympics
Olympic silver medalists for the United States in sailing
Alamitos Bay Yacht Club sailors
World champions in sailing for the United States